There is evidence that corruption is a legitimate problem in Israeli politics and many investigations have taken place into allegations of influence peddling and bribery. 

Transparency International's 2021 Corruption Perception Index ranks the country 36th place out of the 180 countries in the Index, where low-ranking countries are perceived to have an honest public sector and high-ranking countries a corrupt one.

Sometime Prime Minister Benjamin Netanyahu has been indicted for corruption, due to the acceptance of expensive gifts such as fine champagne and cigars.

Corruption does not appear to be institutionalized and businesses can largely operate and invest in Israel without interference from corrupt officials. The judiciary is considered by businesses to be at a low risk of corruption; however, the public services sector is reported to have a moderate risk of corruption, with business leaders reporting the payment of bribes in exchange for access to public utilities, with an ineffective bureaucratic government being considered by some to be the source of the problem.

See also 
 List of Israeli public officials convicted of crimes or misdemeanors
 Anti-Netanyahu Protests
 Trial of Benjamin Netanyahu
 International Anti-Corruption Academy
 Group of States Against Corruption
 International Anti-Corruption Day
 ISO 37001 Anti-bribery management systems
 United Nations Convention against Corruption
 OECD Anti-Bribery Convention
 Transparency International

References

Israel
Israel